The South Bay is a region of the Los Angeles metropolitan area, located in the southwest corner of Los Angeles County. The name stems from its geographic location stretching along the southern shore of Santa Monica Bay. The South Bay contains fifteen cities plus portions of the City of Los Angeles and unincorporated portions of the county. The area is bounded by the Pacific Ocean on the south and west and generally by the City of Los Angeles on the north and east.

Description 
The South Bay includes:
The Beach Cities
El Segundo
Manhattan Beach
Hermosa Beach
Redondo Beach
Torrance
The Palos Verdes Peninsula
Palos Verdes Estates
Rolling Hills
Rolling Hills Estates
Rancho Palos Verdes
The southernmost neighborhoods of the City of Los Angeles
Harbor City
Harbor Gateway
San Pedro
Wilmington
Inland cities of the South Bay
Hawthorne
Gardena
Lawndale
Lomita
Carson
Inglewood
And unincorporated areas of L.A. County including: 
Del Aire
And other small unincorporated "county strip" areas of Los Angeles County.
The region is bordered on the north by Los Angeles International Airport (LAX), on the northeast by the South Los Angeles region, on the east by the Gateway Cities, and on the southeast by Long Beach.

Major employers

Port of Los Angeles
The Port of Los Angeles, sprawling across the shorelines of San Pedro and Wilmington, is the busiest in the United States. When combined with the Port of Long Beach, it is the fifth-busiest in the world.  Traditionally, most of the populations of Wilmington and San Pedro have worked for the port in some capacity.  It is increasingly the primary driver of the Southern California economy: industrial growth in the Inland Empire is almost entirely attributable to increased port traffic since the 1980s. The massive increase in cargo volume has created significant air pollution (especially of particulate matter in neighboring communities, resulting from the combustion of low-grade marine diesel fuel).

Aerospace
The South Bay is the traditional home of Southern California's aerospace industry.  While considerably shrunken from its Cold War peak, it still represents a major economic force, employing thousands in high-skill, high-wage engineering positions and generating enormous amounts of tax revenue. Northrop Grumman has a major facility in El Segundo where the F/A-18 Hornet fuselage is manufactured, as well as the headquarters of the Space Technology division in Redondo Beach and a facility at the Hawthorne Municipal Airport. Howmet Fastening Systems, a subsidiary of Howmet Aerospace which produces aerospace fasteners, has their corporate headquarters located in Torrance with manufacturing facilities in both Torrance and Carson. Boeing and Lockheed Martin also maintain extensive production facilities throughout the South Bay, and Raytheon's Space and Airborne Systems business unit is based in El Segundo.  The Los Angeles Air Force Base and neighboring Aerospace Corporation, in El Segundo, is the locus of much of this aerospace research activity, as it is the primary development facility for military satellites and other space programs. DirecTV, a former subsidiary of Hughes Aircraft, is also headquartered in El Segundo for this reason. SpaceX also headquartered in the South Bay, is located in Hawthorne.

Oil refining

Petroleum refining is another important component of the South Bay's economy. Major South Bay refiners include Tesoro (ARCO facility in Carson), Chevron (El Segundo), Phillips 66 (Wilmington), PBF Energy (Torrance), Tesoro (Wilmington), and Valero (Wilmington).  These refiners supply a large share of petroleum products for Southern California, as well as for Nevada and Arizona.

Automotive
Japanese automobile manufacturer Honda maintains its North American headquarters in the South Bay, in the city of Torrance. (Nissan was also headquartered in the South Bay until late 2005, and The company then relocated to Tennessee, citing the high cost of running a business in California. Toyota left in 2017 for Plano, Texas for many of the same reasons.) While these locations are largely the legacy of the region's historical importance as a Japanese-American population center, it has proven fortuitous for two reasons: first, it enables closer oversight of vehicle import operations at the nearby ports; and second, it gives them proximity to the automobile customization culture that is prominent in nearby South Los Angeles. Tesla is stationed near the headquarters of SpaceX in Hawthorne

Higher education

 California State University, Dominguez Hills
 El Camino College
 Los Angeles Harbor College
 Marymount California University
 Southern California Regional Occupational Center
 University of West Los Angeles

Transportation
The Harbor (I-110), San Diego (I-405), Gardena (SR 91), and Century (I-105) Freeways provide the region with its principal transportation links.

The Los Angeles MTA's A Line (opened in 1990 as the Blue Line) is a light rail line running between Downtown Los Angeles and Downtown Long Beach. It is the first of the MTA's modern rail lines since the 1961 demise of the Pacific Electric Railway's Red Car system. The C Line (opened in 1995 as the Green Line, together with the Glenn Anderson Freeway), a freeway-median light rail line, also serves the South Bay. It runs between Redondo Beach and Norwalk in the median of the Century Freeway (Interstate 105), providing indirect access to LAX via a shuttle bus and future automated people mover. The K Line open from Expo/Crenshaw and Westchester/Verterans but is expected to be fully operational at Aviation/Imperial station in 2023.

Several ports and harbors in the South Bay provide access to Santa Catalina Island, a popular resort. In addition, LAX borders El Segundo to the north in the neighborhood of Westchester, Los Angeles.

Media
In addition to the Los Angeles Times, the South Bay cities are served by daily papers, the Daily Breeze, the weeklies The Beach Reporter and The Easy Reader, a bi-monthly real estate magazine, South Bay DIGS, and lifestyle publication 'Southbay Magazine'. The National Football League has its West Coast headquarters and production facility for NFL Network, NFL RedZone, and the NFL.com app in Inglewood.

Music
The South Bay has a rich history in music, and has produced a number of significant rock bands, like Hawthorne natives The Beach Boys in the early 1960s, and continuing particularly in punk music. Other notable South Bay-based artists include:

 98 Mute (Hermosa Beach)
 Ab-Soul (Carson)
 Black Flag (Hermosa Beach)
 Brandy (Carson)
 By All Means (Torrance)
 Circle Jerks (Hermosa Beach)
 Cuco (Hawthorne) 
 Descendents (Manhattan Beach)
 James Newton Howard (Torrance)
 Ras Kass (Carson)
 KeyKool (Torrance)
 Kurupt (Hawthorne)
 Left Alone (Wilmington)
 Joyce Manor (Torrance)
 Miguel (San Pedro)
 Minutemen (San Pedro)
 Pennywise (Hermosa Beach)
 Ray-J (Carson)
 Redd Kross (Hawthorne)
 Rotting Out (San Pedro)
 Seahaven (Torrance)
 The Thirsty Crows (Redondo Beach)
 Tokimonsta (Torrance)
 Tyler The Creator (Hawthorne)
 The Last (Hermosa Beach)

Black Flag guitarist Greg Ginn's SST record label, a seminal alternative rock label of the 1980s, maintained its headquarters in Lawndale.

Sports and Entertainment
The South Bay is host to many professional sports teams and entertainment venues. The Los Angeles Rams and Los Angeles Chargers of the National Football League play at SoFi Stadium in Inglewood. The LA Galaxy of Major League Soccer play their home games at Dignity Health Sports Park in Carson. 

The Los Angeles Clippers of the National Basketball Association will play in their new stadium, Intuit Dome, in Inglewood beginning 2024.

Various entertainment venues are located in the South Bay, including SoFi Stadium, Kia Forum, and YouTube Theater in Inglewood, Dignity Health Sports Park in Carson, and Toyota Sports Center in El Segundo. Three casinos also operate in the South Bay, the Hollywood Park Casino in Inglewood, and the Normandie Casino and Hustler Casino in Gardena.

See also

 South Bay (Bay Area)
 Juan Maria Sepulveda, former owner of this area

References

External links

 City of Carson
 City of El Segundo
 City of Gardena
 City of Hawthorne
 City of Hermosa Beach
 City of Inglewood
 City of Lawndale
 City of Lomita
 City of Manhattan Beach
 City of Palos Verdes Estates
 City of Rancho Palos Verdes
 City of Redondo Beach
 City of Rolling Hills
 City of Rolling Hills Estates
 City of Torrance
 South Bay Cities Council of Governments

 
Los Angeles County, California regions
Regions of California